Nancy Lee Peoples Guthrie (born June 15, 1952) is an American politician and a Democratic member of the West Virginia House of Delegates representing the 36th district since December 1, 2012. Between 2006 and 2012, Guthrie represented the seven-member 30th district.

Education
Guthrie attended the Pennsylvania State University.

Elections
2012 Redistricted to District 36 with fellow District 30 incumbent Representatives Danny Wells and Mark Hunt, Guthrie placed third in the seven-way May 8, 2012 Democratic Primary with 2,825 votes (20.3%), and placed third in the six-way three-position November 6, 2012 General election with 8,777 votes (18.5%) behind Representatives Hunt (D) and Wells(D), and ahead of Republican nominees Robin Holstein, Stevie Thaxton, and Steve Sweeney.
2006 When District 30 Democratic Representative Hunt took a hiatus from the Legislature and left a seat open, Guthrie placed in the eleven-way 2006 Democratic Primary and was elected in the fourteen-way seven-position November 7, 2006 General election alongside incumbent Democratic Representatives John Amores, Bobbie Hatfield, Sharon Spencer, Corey Palumbo, Bonnie Brown, and Danny Wells.
2008 When Representative Palumbo ran for West Virginia Senate and Representative Amores retired, leaving two district seats open, Guthrie placed seventh in the seventeen-way May 13, 2008 Democratic Primary with 8,844 votes (7.2%), and placed seventh in the fifteen-way seven-position November 4, 2008 General election with 20,285 votes (7.5%) along with Democratic nominee Doug Skaff ahead of all seven Republican nominees and Mountain Party candidate John Welbourn.
2010 Guthrie placed seventh in the thirteen-way May 11, 2010 Democratic Primary with 4,934 votes (9.5%), and placed seventh in the fourteen-way November 2, 2010 General election with 16,301 votes (7.4%) behind Republican nominee Eric Nelson, and ahead of unseated Representative Spencer and the remaining Republican nominees.

References

External links
Official page at the West Virginia Legislature

Nancy Guthrie at Ballotpedia
Nancy Guthrie at OpenSecrets

1952 births
Living people
Democratic Party members of the West Virginia House of Delegates
Politicians from Charleston, West Virginia
People from Havre de Grace, Maryland
Pennsylvania State University alumni
Women state legislators in West Virginia
21st-century American politicians
21st-century American women politicians